Kannambra is a gram panchayat in the Palakkad district, state of Kerala, India. It is the local government organisation that serves the villages of Kannambra-I and Kannambra-II.

Demographics
 India census, Kannambra-I had a population of 13,737 with 6,647 males and 7,090 females.
 India census, Kannambra-II had a population of 10,758 with 5,167 males and 5,591 females.

References 

Villages in Palakkad district